The Elmbridge Guardian is a weekly free local newspaper covering the borough of Elmbridge, in Surrey. It is published once a week, on a Thursday, and is distributed free of charge.

It is available as a free, paperless Elmbridge Guardian e-newspaper, downloadable from Elmbridge Guardian e-newspaper and delivered straight to email inboxes each Thursday morning.

The paper is also sold for 60p at some newsagents and shops around the borough.

It has an average distribution of 21,964, including 2,700 free pick up copies at supermarkets and estate agents. 

The paper is delivered to homes in Esher, Thames Ditton, Long Ditton, Hinchley Wood, Claygate, East Molesey, West Molesey, Weybridge, Walton, Hersham, Cobham and Oxshott.

The newspaper is owned by regional newspaper publisher Newsquest Media Group's South London arm along with other Guardian titles including the Kingston Guardian and the paid-for Surrey Comet.

References

External links
Elmbridge Guardian
Newsquest Media Group

Newspapers published in Surrey
Borough of Elmbridge